Bud Schultz (born William Schultz August 21, 1959) is a former professional tennis player from the United States. 

A 1981 graduate of Bates College, Schultz achieved a career-high singles ranking of world No. 40 in 1986 and a career-high doubles ranking of world No. 128 in 1986.

In 2010, he continues as head coach of New England's Boston Lobsters of World Team Tennis.

ATP finals

Singles (1 runner-up)

Doubles (2 runner-ups)

References

External links
 
 

1959 births
Living people
American male tennis players
Bates College alumni
People from Meriden, Connecticut
Tennis people from Connecticut